Tiramisu (from , "pick me up" or "cheer me up") is a coffee-flavoured Italian dessert. It is made of ladyfingers (savoiardi) dipped in coffee, layered with a whipped mixture of eggs, sugar, and mascarpone cheese, flavoured with cocoa. The recipe has been adapted into many varieties of cakes and other desserts. Its origins are often disputed among Italian regions Veneto and Friuli Venezia Giulia.

History
Tiramisu appears to have been invented in the 1960s, but where and when exactly is unclear.

The recipe for tiramisu is not found in cookbooks before the 1960s. It is mentioned in a Sydney Morning Herald restaurant column published in 1978. It is not mentioned in encyclopedias and dictionaries of the 1970s, first appearing in an Italian dictionary in 1980, and in English in 1982. It is mentioned in a 1983 cookbook devoted to cooking of the Veneto. 

Obituaries for the restaurateur Ado Campeol (1928–2021) reported that it was invented at his restaurant Le Beccherie in Treviso on 24 December 1969 by his wife Alba di Pillo (1929–2021) and the pastry chef Roberto Linguanotto. The dish was added to its menu in 1972. Accounts by Carminantonio Iannaccone claim the tiramisu sold at Le Beccherie was made by him in his bakery, created on 24 December 1969.

It has been claimed that tiramisu has aphrodisiac effects and was concocted by a 19th-century Treviso brothel madam, as the Accademia Del Tiramisù explains, to "solve the problems they may have had with their conjugal duties on their return to their wives".

There is evidence of a "Tiremesù" semi-frozen dessert served by the Vetturino restaurant in Pieris, in the Friuli Venezia Giulia, since 1938. This may be the name's origin, while the recipe for Tiramisu may have originated as a variation of another layered dessert, Zuppa Inglese. Others claim it was created towards the end of the 17th century in Siena in honour of Grand Duke Cosimo III.

On 29 July 2017, Tiramisu was entered by the Ministry of Agricultural, Food and Forestry Policies on the list of traditional Friulian and Giulian agri-food products in the Friuli Venezia Giulia region. In 2013, Luca Zaia, governor of Veneto sought European Union Protected Status certification for the dessert, based on the ingredients used in 1970, so substitute ingredients, such as strawberries, could not be used in a dish called tiramisu.

Original ingredients
Traditional tiramisu contains a short list of ingredients: ladyfingers (savoiardi), egg yolks, sugar, coffee, mascarpone cheese, and cocoa powder. A common variant involves soaking the savoiardi in alcohol, such as Marsala wine, amaretto or a coffee-based liqueur, but this is not mentioned in the original recipe.

The original tiramisu made at Le Beccherie was circular in shape.

Variations

The original shape of the cake is round, although the shape of the biscuits also allows the use of a rectangular or square pan. However, it is often assembled in round glasses, which show the various layers, or pyramid. Modern versions can have the addition of whipped cream or whipped egg, or both, combined with mascarpone cream. This makes the dish lighter, thick and foamy. Among the most common alcoholic changes includes the addition of Marsala wine. The cake is usually eaten cold.

Another variation involves the preparation of the cream with eggs heated to sterilize it, but not so much that the eggs scramble. Over time, replacing some of the ingredients, mainly coffee, there arose numerous variants such as tiramisu with chocolate, amaretto, berry, lemon, strawberry, pineapple, yogurt, banana, raspberry, and coconut. These, however, are not considered true Tiramisu as these variations only share the layered characteristic of Tiramisu; these examples more closely resemble variations of trifle.

Numerous variations of Tiramisu exist. Some cooks use other cakes or sweet, yeasted breads, such as panettone, in place of ladyfingers (savoiardi). Bakers living in different Italian regions often debate the use and structural qualities of utilising other types of cookies, such as pavesini for instance, in the recipe. Other cheese mixtures are used as well, some containing raw eggs, and others containing no eggs at all. Marsala wine can be added to the recipe, but other liquors are frequently substituted for it in both the coffee and the cheese mixture, including dark rum, Madeira, port, brandy, Malibu, or Irish cream and especially coffee-flavoured liqueurs such as Tia Maria and Kahlúa. Amaretto liqueurs, such as Disaronno, are also often used to enhance the taste of tiramisu.

Tiramisu is similar to other desserts, in particular with the Charlotte, in some versions composed of a Bavarian cream surrounded by a crown of ladyfingers and covered by a sweet cream; the Turin cake (dolce Torino), consisting of ladyfingers soaked in rosolio and alchermes with a spread made of butter, egg yolks, sugar, milk, and dark chocolate; and the Bavarese Lombarda, which is a similar composition of ladyfingers and egg yolks (albeit cooked ones). In Bavarese, butter and rosolio (or alchermes) are also used, but not mascarpone cream or coffee.

See also

 Charlotte
 Cheesecake
 Crema de fruta
 List of coffee dishes
 Opera cake
 Profiterole
 Serradura
 Trifle

References

Coffee dishes
Cuisine of Veneto
Custard desserts
Italian cakes
Italian desserts